Second Amendment may refer to:

Second Amendment to the United States Constitution, part of the United States Bill of Rights, protecting the right of the people to keep and bear arms
1992 Colorado Amendment 2
Florida Amendment 2 (2008), an amendment to the Constitution of Florida that prohibited same-sex marriage.
Second Amendment of the Constitution of India
Second Amendment of the Constitution of Ireland, an omnibus amendment
Second Amendment of the Constitution of South Africa, which made various technical changes
Australian referendum, 1910 (State Debts), the second amendment to the Constitution of Australia
Second Amendments, an American country-rock band that consisted of 5 members of the U.S. House of Representatives